Mont Coin is a mountain of Savoie, France. It lies in the Beaufortain Masif range.

Mountains of the Alps
Mountains of Savoie